Francisco Diego Maciel (born September 17, 1977 in Buenos Aires) is a retired Argentine footballer who played as a right back.

Maciel made his debut in the Argentine Primera with Deportivo Español on December 8, 1996 against Rosario Central. In 1998, he was signed by Club Almagro, where he played for the next three years. Subsequently, his solid performance bought him a transferred to Racing Club. In his first spell with Racing the club won the Clausura 2001, the first title for the club in 35 years. In 2002 Maciel moved to Spain and spent some time playing for Real Murcia and RCD Mallorca. In 2006, he returned to Argentina and got signed by Racing. His second spell with the academia lasted until late 2007. The following year he transferred to Club Atlético Huracán, but since his arrival he was condemned to the bench, making only a single appearance for Huracán. After he left the club, he was inactive for seven months, until he got an offer from Bolivian side Bolívar for which he signed in July 2009.

Club titles

External links
 Argentine Primera statistics
Francisco Maciel at Football Lineups

1977 births
Living people
Footballers from Buenos Aires
Argentine footballers
Argentine people of Spanish descent
Association football defenders
Deportivo Español footballers
Club Almagro players
Racing Club de Avellaneda footballers
La Liga players
RCD Mallorca players
Real Murcia players
Club Atlético Huracán footballers
Club Bolívar players
Argentine expatriate sportspeople in Spain
Expatriate footballers in Bolivia
Argentine expatriate sportspeople in Bolivia